Farum Rectory is a listed rectory located adjacent to the graveyard surrounding Farum Church in the old, western part of Farum, Denmark. Built in 1724, the house has timber framing and a thatched roof. It was listed in 1959.

See also
 Farumgaard

References

Listed buildings and structures in Furesø Municipality
Clergy houses in Denmark
Houses completed in 1724
Timber framed buildings in Furesø Municipality
Thatched buildings in Denmark
1724 establishments in Denmark
Farum